The Ultimate Thrill is a 1974 American thriller film directed by Robert Butler and starring Barry Brown, Britt Ekland and Eric Braeden. It was also released under the title Ultimate Chase. The soundtrack was by Ed Townsend which to the present day has not been released.

Plot

Cast
 Barry Brown as Joe Straker
 Britt Ekland as Michele Parlay 
 Eric Braeden as Roland Parlay
 Michael Blodgett as Tom 
 John Davis Chandler as Evans 
 Ed Baierlein as Webster 
 Paul Feliz as Fielder 
 Carol Adams as The Secretary 
 Sam Darling as The Bartender
 June Goodman as Pretzel 
 Mary Hampton as Woman At Deli 
 David Kahn as Denver Clerk 
 Hallie McCollum as Day Clerk 
 Ronald L. Schwary as Danny 
 Gary Tessler as Night Clerk

See also
 List of American films of 1974

References

External links

1974 films
1970s thriller films
1970s English-language films
Films directed by Robert Butler
American thriller films
1970s American films